Gordon Charles Danielson (October 28, 1912 - September 30, 1983) was a Distinguished Professor in Sciences and Humanities in 1964 at Iowa State University at Ames, Iowa.

His name was added to the  Distinguished Professor Award Wall in Beardsher Hall.

A scholarship fund, the Gordon C. Danielson Fund was established in his name.

Danielson collaborated  with Cornelius Lanczos to write the paper, Some Improvements in Practical Fourier Analysis and their Application to X-ray Scattering from Liquids (1942).  The Danielson-Lanczos lemma, which appears in this paper, is the basis of the Cooley–Tukey FFT algorithm, an efficient algorithm for computing the discrete Fourier transform.

With L. D. Muhlstein he wrote Effects of Ordering on the Transport Properties of Sodium Tungsten Bronze (1967).

References

Effects of Ordering on the Transport Properties of Sodium Tungsten Bronze

American physicists
Iowa State University faculty
1983 deaths
1912 births